Bodenheim is a state-recognized tourism municipality (Fremdenverkehrsgemeinde) in the Mainz-Bingen district of Rhineland-Palatinate, Germany.

Bodenheim may also refer to:

Bodenheim (Verbandsgemeinde),  a collective municipality in the German district of Mainz-Bingen, encompassing the tourism municipality

People:
Maxwell Bodenheim (1892–1954), American poet and novelist.
Nelly Bodenheim (1874–1951), Dutch illustrator

See also
Bodenheimer, a surname